Xakriabá may refer to:
Xakriabá people
Xakriabá language
Otocinclus xakriaba, a species of catfish
Célia Xakriabá indigenous educational activists